Chaar Maharathi is a 1985 Indian Hindi-language action drama film directed by S. Waris Ali. It stars Mithun Chakraborty, Kader Khan, Amjad Khan, Om Shivpuri in the title role, along with Tina Munim, Asha Parekh in the pivotal roles. The music was composed by music director, Sonik Omi.

Plot
Suleman, Raju, John, and Shakti confronts with a dacoit Devi Singh while searching for hidden treasure of deceased Mr. Raina. Latter it reveals that Raju is the lost son of Mr. Raina.

Cast
Mithun Chakraborty as Raju
Tina Munim as Phool
Asha Parekh as Sharda
Kader Khan as Sulaiman
Amjad Khan as Shakti
Om Shivpuri as John
Raza Murad as DSP Anil Kumar

Songs

References

External links
 

1980 films
1980s Hindi-language films
Films scored by Sonik-Omi
Indian Western (genre) films